Richard Madsen is distinguished Professor of Sociology the University of California, San Diego, specializing in sociology of China.

Biography
Madsen received his A.B. at the Department of Philosophy at Maryknoll College and his B.D. (1967) and M.Th. (1968) at Maryknoll Seminary. He then moved to Taiwan to study at the Chinese Language Institute in Fu Jen Catholic University (1968-1970) and at the Department of Sociology at National Taiwan University (1970-1971). Upon his return to the United States, he completed his M.A. in Religious Studies (1972) and Ph.D. in Sociology (1977), both on East Asia from Harvard.

He joined the University of California, San Diego since 1983 and was promoted to Professor in 1985. He was Chair of the Program in Chinese Studies between 1984 and 1987. He was a co-director of a Ford Foundation project to help revive the academic discipline of sociology in China and was Director of UC Fudan Center at the School of Global Policy and Strategy.

He is the recipient of several book awards, including a Jury Nominee for the Pulitzer Prize in General Non-fiction and the L.A. Times Book Award for Habits of the Heart: Individualism and Commitment in American Life  (1985), as well as the C. Wright Mills Award for Morality and Power in a Chinese Village (1984).

Selected works

 Yang-Hsu, Becky and Richard Madsen (2019). The Chinese Pursuit of Happiness Anxieties, Hopes, and Moral Tensions in Everyday Life. Berkeley: University of California Press. ISBN 9780520306325
 Madsen, Richard (2007). Democracy's Dharma: Religious Renaissance and Political Development in Taiwan. Berkeley: University of California Press. ISBN 9780520252271
 Madsen, Richard (1998). China's Catholics Tragedy and Hope in an Emerging Civil Society. Berkeley: University of California Press. ISBN 9780520920736
 Madsen, Richard (1995). China and the American Dream: A Moral Inquiry. Berkeley: University of California Press. ISBN 9780520914926
 Bellah, Robert Neelly, Richard Madsen, William M. Sullivan, Ann Swidler, and Steven M. Tipton (1985). Habits of the Heart: Individualism and Commitment in American Life. Berkeley: University of California Press. ISBN 9780520053885
 Madsen, Richard (1984). Morality and Power in a Chinese Village. Berkeley: University of California Press. ISBN 9780520059252
 Chan, Anita, Richard Madsen, and Jonathan Unger Berkeley: University of California Press. (1984). Chen Village Revolution to Globalization. ISBN 9780520259317

References

Living people
Fu Jen Catholic University alumni
National Taiwan University alumni
Harvard Graduate School of Arts and Sciences alumni
University of California, San Diego faculty
East Asian studies scholars
Sociologists of religion
Year of birth missing (living people)